Maksym Oleksandrovych Semiankiv (born January 20, 1992) is a Ukrainian male artistic gymnast and part of the national team.  He participated at the 2015 World Artistic Gymnastics Championships in Glasgow, and qualified for the 2016 Summer Olympics.

References

External links 
 
 
 

1992 births
Living people
Ukrainian male artistic gymnasts
Place of birth missing (living people)
Gymnasts at the 2016 Summer Olympics
Olympic gymnasts of Ukraine
Universiade medalists in gymnastics
Universiade silver medalists for Ukraine
Medalists at the 2013 Summer Universiade
21st-century Ukrainian people